The Muan, Moan or Mohan (moo-ahn), sometimes also known as Poira is a name applied to several mythological or otherwise supernatural creatures in South and Central American folklore. The most common and widespread use of the term is to refer to the souls of the dead and the indigenous ancestors of old. The word is also used for shamans or witch doctors in some Colombian indigenous cultures (such as the Panches).

History
Various different legends exist about the Mohan, with many of them emerging from Colombia. In Colombia, Mohan can also mean a forest or barren land spirit. In some legends, it is a satyr-like being who steals and rapes young women and lives in a cave-like grotto in the bottom of the great jungle rivers where he keeps his female captives. In others, it is depicted as the spirit of an old Indian, brawny and stout, with a terrifying grin and stare, with larger than human stature and proportions, who steals fishermen's bait, catch or nets, and has the power to change shape into a cat-like beast. Other legends describe the Mohan as a "big-headed Indian, with short legs and fish fins on his back, and very brown." He is portrayed as an extremely hairy being with a very treacherous personality who dwells in the backwaters and is feared by many people. He also causes mischief for young girls who come to wash clothes in the water. The Mohan is also known as an avatar whose form shamans are able to adopt. One myth tells of how a shaman became an alligator in order to be close to the girls who played in the river. The shaman was not able to fully transform back into a human, and became an alligator with a human head. The Poira, whose name is interchangeable with the Mohan, is described by others as an Indian warlock who lives on the Cerro del Pacandé in Tolima, Colombia. The Poira is also believed to be a small, naked invisible boy or adult who can also appear formless or as a black bear.

See also
 Pillan
 Curupira
 Caipora
 Patasola

References

Indigenous South American legendary creatures
Shapeshifting
Mythological characters
Colombian folklore
Myths and legends of Colombia
Caribbean region of Colombia
Mythology of the Americas
South American mythology